In American butchery, the sirloin steak (called the rump steak in British butchery) is cut from the sirloin, the subprimal posterior to the short loin where the  T-bone, porterhouse, and club steaks are cut.  The sirloin is actually divided into several types of steak. The top sirloin is the most prized of these and is specifically marked for sale under that name. The bottom sirloin, which is less tender and much larger, is typically marked for sale simply as "sirloin steak". The bottom sirloin, in turn, connects to the sirloin tip roast.

In a common British, South African, and Australian butchery, the word sirloin refers to cuts of meat from the upper middle of the animal, similar to the American short loin, while the American sirloin is called the rump. Because of this difference in terminology, in these countries, the T-bone steak is regarded as a cut of the sirloin.

Etymology
The word sirloin derives from the Middle English surloine, itself derived from the Old French word surloigne (variant of surlonge), that is, sur for 'above' and longe for 'loin'. In Modern French, the cut of meat is called aloyau or faux-filet.

A fictitious etymology explains the name as being derived from an occasion when a king of England knighted the loin of beef as "Sir loin". In fact, though the pun is reported as early as 1630, and the notion of a king knighting it dates to 1655, the name predates any of the kings who are mentioned. The story at most influenced the spelling sir rather than sur.

Dishes

See also

 Cut of beef
 List of steak dishes

References

External links

 

Cuts of beef